Grief counseling is a form of psychotherapy that aims to help people cope with the physical, emotional, social, spiritual, and cognitive responses to loss. These experiences are commonly thought to be brought on by a loved person's death, but may more broadly be understood as shaped by any significant life-altering loss (e.g., divorce, home foreclosure, or job loss).

Grief counselors believe that everyone experiences and expresses grief in personally unique ways that are shaped by family background, culture, life experiences, personal values, and intrinsic beliefs. They believe that it is not uncommon for a person to withdraw from their friends and family and feel helpless; some might be angry and want to take action. Some may laugh while others experience strong regrets or guilt. Tears or the lack of crying can both be seen as appropriate expressions of grief.

Grief counselors know that one can expect a wide range of emotion and behavior associated with grief. Some counselors believe that in virtually all places and cultures, the grieving person benefits from the support of others. Further, grief counselors believe that where such support is lacking, counseling may provide an avenue for healthy resolution. Grief counselors also believe that where the process of grieving is interrupted, for example, by the one who is grieving having to simultaneously deal with practical issues of survival or by their having to be the strong one who is striving to hold their family together, grief can remain unresolved and later resurface as an issue for counseling.

Counseling 
Grief counseling is commonly recommended for individuals who experience difficulties dealing with a personally significant loss. Grief counseling facilitates expression of emotion and thought about the loss, including their feeling sad, anxious, angry, lonely, guilty, relieved, isolated, confused etc.

Grief counseling facilitates the process of coming to terms with the loss that the individual has experienced, and processing through the natural progression of feelings that might come with different stages of coping with the loss. Grief counselling sessions also encompass segments on increasing an individual's personal and social resources to cope better with grief. There are considerable resources online covering grief or loss counseling such as the Grief Counseling Resource Guide from the New York State Office of Mental Health.

Types of grief 
There are various types of grief that individuals might go through. The most commonly seen types of grief fall into these four categories:

Anticipatory grief

Anticipatory grief refers to a sense of loss before the actual occurrence of loss. This can occur when a loved one has a terminal illness, or one is personally being diagnosed with a chronic illness, or when one faces the imminent loss of some human function.

Normal grief

Normal grief is the natural experience of loss and emotions accompanies the death of a loved one, and usually subsides in intensity over time. Normal grief is usually accompanied by the symptoms of a depressed mood, sleep disturbances, and crying.

Complicated grief

Grief that is prolonged and resultant in severe behavioral concerns such as suicidal ideation, addictions, risk-taking behavior, or displaying symptoms of mental health concerns. In these situations, more in-depth counseling and psychotherapy would be important in helping the individual recover from the traumatic loss.

Disenfranchised grief

Disenfranchised grief is grief that is not made known to others, such as in the case of a young mother who aborts her child without the knowledge of her parents or others. Another example can be in the case of an extramarital lover whose lover passed on. In these cases, the grieving process is compromised as they are unable to process through this grief with others and receive the social support they need to overcome their grief.

Theories on the grief cycle 
Joanne Jozefowski in 1999 through The Phoenix Phenomenon: Rising from the Ashes of Grief summarizes five stages to rebuild a shattered life.

 Impact: shock, denial, anxiety, fear, and panic.
 Chaos: confusion, disbelief, actions out of control, irrational thoughts and feelings, feeling despair, feeling helpless, desperate searching, losing track of time, difficulty sleeping and eating, obsessive focus on the loved one and their possessions, agony from imagining their physical harm, shattered beliefs.
 Adapting: bringing order back into daily life while you continue to grieve: take care of basic needs (personal grooming, shopping, cooking, cleaning, paying bills), learn to live without the loved one, accept help, focus on helping children cope, connect with other grieving families for mutual support, take control of grieving so that grief does not control you, slowly accept the new reality.
 Equilibrium: attaining stability and routines: reestablish a life that works alright, enjoy pleasant activities with family members and good times with friends, do productive work, choose a positive new direction in life while honoring the past, learn how to handle people who ask questions about what you’ve been through.
 Transformation: rethinking your purpose in life and the basis for your identity; looking for meaning in tragic, senseless loss; allowing yourself to have both painful and positive feelings about your loss and become able to choose which feelings you focus on; allowing yourself to discover that your struggle has led you to develop a stronger, better version of yourself than you expected could exist; learning how to talk with others about your heroic healing journey without exposing them to your pain; becoming supportive of others trying to deal with their losses.

The most commonly acknowledged and cited grief model is the Five Stages of Grief by Dr. Elizabeth Kübler-Ross, which posits that individuals who experience grief tend to go through a cycle of these 5 stages:

 Denial - Arises as a result of the shock experienced by individuals, and can manifest in the form of numbness, nonchalence, or avoidance. This is a survival instinct of the mind to help individuals pace out the emotional impact that the loss has on the individual. 
 Anger - After the reality of the individual's death has set in, anger sets in as well, as individuals starts placing the blame on others or themselves. They might also question their religion. 
 Bargaining - At the stage, individuals might begin to ask many "If Only" and "What If" questions, imagining what could have been, should surrounding circumstances be different. 
 Depression - This stage is when sadness and feelings of hopelessness sets in, as one realises the irreversability of death. The emptiness experienced as a result of the gap that is left when the loved one passed on becomes apparent, and the grieving individual questions whether he/she would be able to live a happy life without the deceased. A common question asked at this point is, "Is there really a point in living?" . It is important, however, to note that depression in this context does not refer to the mental disorder but rather strong feelings of sadness and hopelessness. 
 Acceptance - After some time, the individual might adjust to life without the deceased. At this point, the individual might make the conclusion that this is a reality that he/she would have to manage, and make an effort to engage in new hobbies, activities, or create new memories with other friends and family members who are good emotional support to the grieving person.

Grief therapy 
There is a distinction between grief counseling and grief therapy. Counseling involves helping people move through uncomplicated, or normal, grief to health and resolution. Grief therapy involves the use of clinical tools for traumatic or complicated grief reactions. This could occur where the grief reaction is prolonged or manifests itself through some bodily or behavioral symptom, or by a grief response outside the range of cultural or psychiatrically defined normality.

Grief therapy is a kind of psychotherapy used to treat severe or complicated traumatic grief reactions, which are usually brought on by the loss of a close person (by separation or death) or by community disaster. The goal of grief therapy is to identify and solve the psychological and emotional problems which appeared as a consequence.

They may appear as behavioral or physical changes, psychosomatic disturbances, delayed or extreme mourning, conflictual problems or sudden and unexpected mourning. Grief therapy may be available as individual or group therapy. A common area where grief therapy has been extensively applied is with the parents of cancer patients.

Controversies

Efficacy and iatrogenesis 

At present (as of 2008), a controversy exists in the scholarly literature regarding grief therapy's relative efficacy and the possible harm from it (iatrogenesis). Researchers have suggested that people may resort to receiving grief therapy in the absence of complicated (or abnormal) grief reactions and that, in such cases, grief therapy may cause a normal bereavement response to turn pathological. Others have argued that grief therapy is highly effective for people who suffer from unusually prolonged and complicated responses to bereavement.

In March 2007, an article in the APS journal, Perspectives on Psychological Science, included grief counseling and grief therapy on a list of treatments with the potential to cause harm to clients. In particular, individuals experiencing "relatively normal bereavement reactions" were said to be at risk of a worse outcome (i.e, an abnormally prolonged or difficult grieving process) after receiving grief counseling. The APS journal article in turn has been criticized in the British Psychological Society's publication the psychologist as lacking scientific rigour.

Validity of "complicated grief" 

Some mental health professionals have questioned whether complicated grief exists. New diagnostic criteria for "complicated grief" have been proposed for the new DSM, the DSM-V. One argument against creating a classification for "complicated grief" holds that it is not a unique mental disorder. Rather it is a combination of other mental disorders, such as depression, posttraumatic stress disorder, and personality disorders.

Empirical studies have been attempting to convincingly establish the incremental validity of complicated grief. In 2007, George Bonanno and colleagues published a paper describing a study that supports the incremental validity of complicated grief. The paper cautions, "the question of how complicated grief symptoms might be organized diagnostically is still very much open to debate." As this is a current debate in the field, new research on this topic is likely to appear in the scientific literature.

Trauma counseling
Anticipating the impact of loss or trauma (to the extent than anyone can), and during and after the events of loss or trauma, each person has unique emotional experiences and ways of coping, of grieving and of reacting or not. Sudden, violent or unexpected loss or trauma imposes additional strains on coping. When a community is affected such as by disaster both the cost and sometimes the supports are greater.

Weeping, painful feelings of sadness, anger, shock, guilt, helplessness and outrage are not uncommon. These are particularly challenging times for children who may have had little experience managing strong affects within themselves or in their family. These feelings are all part of a natural healing process that draws on the resilience of the person, family and community.

Time and the comfort and support of understanding loved ones and once strangers who come to their aid, supports people healing in their own time and their own way. Research shows that resilience is ordinary rather than extraordinary. The majority of people who survive loss and trauma do not go on to develop PTSD. However, some remain overwhelmed and trapped in their fight-or-flight state.

This article addresses counseling with complex grief and trauma, not only complex post-traumatic stress disorder but those conditions of traumatic loss and psychological trauma that for a number of reasons are enduring or disabling. For example, where an adult is periodically immobilized by unwelcome and intrusive recall of the sudden and violent death of a parent in their childhood.

The post-trauma self
Because of the interconnectedness of trauma, PTSD, human development, resiliency and the integration of the self, counseling of the complex traumatic aftermath of a violent death in the family, for example, require an integrative approach, using a variety of skills and techniques to best fit the presentation of the problem.

The post-traumatic self may not be the same person as before. Personality changes due to the effects of trauma can be the source of intense shame, secondary shocks after the event and of grief for the lost unaltered self, which impacts on family and work.<ref>{{cite journal | last1 = Wislon | first1 = J.P | year = 2006 | title = Posttraumatic Shame and Guilt | url = https://semanticscholar.org/paper/34115095480ec005ad51c34ed10259444ee0e568| journal = Trauma, Violence, & Abuse | volume = 7 | issue = 2| pages = 122–141 | doi = 10.1177/1524838005285914 | pmid = 16534148 | s2cid = 599277 }}</ref> Counseling in these circumstances is designed to maximize safety, trauma processing, and reintegration regardless of the specific treatment approach. Post-trauma individuals must have space to safely face and process the event. There is no specific treatment approach for each individual, but processing and reintegration must be the focus. 

 See also 

 References 

Sources
Hammerschlag, Carl A. The Dancing Healers. San Francisco: Harper San Francisco, 1988.

Staudacher, Carol. A Time to Grieve: Mediations for Healing after the Death of a Loved One. San Francisco: Harper San Francisco, 1994.

Further reading
 Yarbrough, Julie (2015). Grief Light: Reflections on Grief''. .

Counseling
Death customs
Grief
Psychotherapies